The 2018–19 season was Sheffield United's 130th season in their history and second consecutive in the Championship. Along with the Championship, the club also competed in the FA Cup and EFL Cup. The season covers the period from 1 July 2018 to 30 June 2019. They were promoted to the Premier League during this season, after a long battle with Leeds United. A 2–0 home victory vs Ipswich Town sealed their first promotion to the top flight since 2005-06.

Their season started poorly after they fell to bottom of the league after 2 defeats to Swansea City and Middlesbrough respectively. They bounced back with 4 wins in a row between games 3 and 6. They had mixed form until Christmas, but after the halfway point they suffered just 2 defeats in 23 games. 2 draws to Birmingham City and Millwall late on in the season made it look a hard task for Sheffield United to finish 2nd. However, Leeds United somewhat bottled the season in the late stages and Sheffield United were presented with a chance to seal promotion against Ipswich Town on Matchday 45. They won the game 2–0 and were all but promoted to the Premier League. Their victory was arithmetically confirmed after Leeds United drew 1–1 at home to Aston Villa.

Squad

Statistics

|-
!colspan=14|Player(s) out on loan:

|-
!colspan=14|Players who left the club:

|}

Goals record

Disciplinary record

Transfers

Transfers in

Transfers out

Loans in

Loans out

Competitions

Friendlies
Sheffield United announced, on 16 May 2018, that a friendly away to Stocksbridge Park Steels was scheduled for 7 July. Three fixtures, against Bradford City, Mansfield Town and Doncaster Rovers, were revealed on 18 May.

Championship

League table

Results summary

Results by matchday

Matches
On 21 June 2018, the Championship fixtures for the forthcoming season were announced.

FA Cup

The third round draw was made live on BBC by Ruud Gullit and Paul Ince from Stamford Bridge on 3 December 2018.

EFL Cup

On 15 June 2018, the draw for the first round was made in Vietnam.

References

Sheffield United F.C. seasons
Sheffield United